The 2015 European Short Course Swimming Championships (25 m) took place in Netanya, Israel, from 2–6 December 2015. They were originally scheduled to be held in January 2015, but the LEN moved the event to December. The venue of the event was the brand new swimming complex of the Wingate Institute. This complex features an Olympic-size pool with 10 lanes and 3 meter depth, backed by the latest built-in filtration systems, an 8-lane 50 m pool and a 6-lane 25 m pool.

The swimmer of the meet honors went to Katinka Hosszú of Hungary and Gregorio Paltrinieri of Italy. Hosszú won six gold medals and one silver, breaking two world records and six championship records, while Paltrinieri won one gold medal in a world record time.

Records broken

Results

Men's events

Legend: WR - World record; ER - European record; CR - Championship record

Women's events

Legend: WR - World record; ER - European record; CR - Championship record

Mixed events

Legend: WR - World record; ER - European record; CR - Championship record

Medal table

Participating nations
500 swimmers from 48 nations participated at the competition. The only LEN members did not participate are Gibraltar, Monaco, Montenegro and San Marino. 

 (2) 
 (2) 
 (2) 
 (19) 
 (3) 
 (13) 
 (11) 
 (3) 
 (2) 
 (9) 
 (2) 
 (27) 
 (8) 
 (16) 
 (3) 
 (22) 
 (13) 
 (2) 
 (27) 
 (12) 
 (3) 
 (27) 
 (3) 
 (2) 
 (46) (Host country) 
 (36) 
 (2) 
 (3) 
 (1) 
 (7) 
 (6) 
 (1) 
 (2) 
 (3) 
 (13) 
 (8) 
 (8) 
 (14) 
 (5) 
 (38) 
 (7) 
 (12) 
 (10) 
 (4) 
 (7) 
 (11) 
 (18) 
 (5)

References

External links
 Official website
 Results

European Short Course Swimming Championships
European Short Course Swimming Championships
European Short Course Swimming Championships
Swimming competitions in Israel
International sports competitions hosted by Israel
Sport in Netanya
European Short Course Swimming Championships